Yarrawonga Park is a suburb of the City of Lake Macquarie in New South Wales, Australia, and is located on a peninsula east of the town of Morisset on the western side of Lake Macquarie.

History 
The name is of Aboriginal origin but its meaning is uncertain.

The Awabakal people are the first people of this area.

Casuarina (she-oak) trees were situated among the waterfront. This attracted the timber industry, as timber from such trees were good for roofing. Shingle Splitters Point (named after the workers, who were called "shingle splitters") in neighbouring Balcolyn was used as an anchorage and loading place.

References

External links
 History of Yarrawonga Park (Lake Macquarie City Library)

Suburbs of Lake Macquarie